Gottfried Christoph Beireis (2 March 1730 – 18 September 1809) was a German chemist and doctor. He was also a collector of curiosities who rescued some of Jacques de Vaucanson's automata.

Biography
Beireis was born in Mühlhausen. He taught anatomy, medicine, surgery, chemistry, botany, natural history, pharmacy, mineralogy, metallurgy, agriculture, forestry, music, painting, and numismatics.

As a student, he discovered a way to convert ammonium sulfide to cinnabar and made a fortune selling the latter as a red dye.

Beireis was a student of Georg Erhardt Hamberger's in Jena in 1753. Beireis became a professor in 1759 without having obtained his MD degree; the degree was awarded subsequently for work done at Helmstadt under Lorenz Heister between 1756 and 1759.

He died in Helmstedt.

References

External links
Beireis bio

18th-century German chemists
18th-century German physicians
1730 births
1809 deaths
People from Mühlhausen
Members of the Göttingen Academy of Sciences and Humanities